Seaton is a town in the Gippsland region of Victoria, Australia, located in the Shire of Wellington,  east of the state capital, Melbourne. The town has a population of 161 people as of 2021, up from a population of 157 in 2016.

The Post Office opened on 1 December 1862 as Bald Hills (Gippsland), was renamed Seaton in 1879, and closed in 1967.

References

1862 establishments in Australia
Towns in Victoria (Australia)
Shire of Wellington